Threshold is an American science fiction drama television series that first aired on CBS in September 2005. Produced by Brannon Braga, David S. Goyer and David Heyman, the series focuses on a secret government project investigating the first contact with an extraterrestrial species.

The series was first shown on Friday nights, but was moved to Tuesday in an effort to boost ratings. This plan backfired, with the show registering a sharp drop in its ratings on its first Tuesday night showing on November 22, 2005, and CBS canceled the series on November 23, 2005, with four episodes left unaired.

The remaining episodes were aired on Sky1, a channel in the United Kingdom owned by Sky, who co-produced the series with CBS. The entire series was released on DVD on August 22, 2006.

Overview 
The series stars Carla Gugino as Dr. Molly Caffrey, a high-level government crisis management consultant from the Blackwood Institute whose job is to create contingency plans for use in emergencies ranging from natural disasters to nuclear war. In order to have "all bases covered", one of her plans, code-named Threshold, is developed for dealing with the unlikely eventuality of first contact with aliens. One night, the crew of a U.S. naval vessel encounters a UFO. Many crew members subsequently die horribly, but some escape. After the ship is discovered with dead crew members and a videotape of the encounter, the Threshold protocol is activated.

Caffrey's Threshold plan calls for the formation of a secret government task force known as the Red Team. As a result, several top scientists are seconded: Dr. Nigel Fenway (Brent Spiner), an individualistic NASA-employed microbiologist; Lucas Pegg (Rob Benedict), a somewhat unsure-of-himself aerospace engineer on the eve of his marriage, and Arthur Ramsey (Peter Dinklage), a mathematics and linguistics genius with a penchant for unpredictability, alcohol and women. Caffrey's government liaison is Deputy National Security Advisor J.T. Baylock (Charles S. Dutton), while freelance paramilitary operative Sean Cavennaugh (Brian Van Holt) serves as the "muscle" of the group (and apparent potential love interest for Caffrey). Daphne Larson (Catherine Bell) was added to the team in the episode "Outbreak". Caffrey's team works under absolute secrecy, their activities not even known to the Vice-President, or the Joint Chiefs of Staff.

Threshold learns that the aliens are attempting to rewrite the DNA of the human race using, in part, an audio signal that somehow alters some people's body chemistry in such a way that they become alien themselves. Central to all this is a fractal triskelion pattern that keeps appearing – in electronic signals, blood, and even the pattern made by city lights. Its significance has yet to be revealed, though Arthur Ramsey interpreted it as representing a DNA pattern in a triple helix formation (like the alien DNA).

The episodes focus on Caffrey and her team as they learn more about the signal, the fractal pattern, and the aliens. Often, their work requires them to impersonate different U.S. Government agencies. Compounding the situation, Caffrey, Cavennaugh and Pegg were exposed to a small part of the signal, which while not (as yet) infecting them, has nonetheless altered their brains, causing the trio to have bizarre, linked dreams, and also receive messages from the aliens with Caffrey, in particular, experiencing frightening, often violent hallucinations. Individuals experiencing these visions have been referred to as "dreamers" by the Threshold Red Team.

An ongoing subplot of the series is the emotional impact Threshold has on Caffrey herself, as she is required to make life-and-death decisions on an almost daily basis. The impact on other members of her team is also explored.

Opening monologue

The monologue was used in episodes 1–9, but was dropped for the remaining episodes.  It also was not used for any of the episodes in the DVD version.

Cast

Main 
 Carla Gugino as Dr. Molly Anne Caffrey 
 Charles S. Dutton as J.T. Baylock 
 Brent Spiner as Dr. Nigel Fenway
 Rob Benedict as Lucas Pegg 
 Brian Van Holt as Sean Cavennaugh
 Peter Dinklage as Arthur Ramsey

Prior to Threshold'''s cancellation Brannon Braga announced that Catherine Bell would be joining the series, as would another actress, Jacqueline Kim, who would appear as Lucas's wife Rachel. In the unaired episode "Outbreak", Bell guest stars as Dr. Daphne Larson, a botanist brought in to examine the mutated vegetables from "Revelations". She is added as a new member to the Red Team, but except for being referenced by name in "Vigilante", made no further appearances on the series before it ended.

 Guest stars
 Dr. Daphne Larson (Catherine Bell): Botanist and leading expert in genetic engineering. Brought into the Threshold team after it was confirmed that people were getting infected after eating GM food created by Sonntag. (in "Outbreak")
 Dr. Julian Sloan (Jeffrey Donovan): Due to a rare genetic disorder he was only half transformed into an infectee. Sloan is unique in the fact he can physically see those altered by the signal. (in "Vigilante")
 Gunneson (William Mapother): A crew member of the U.S. Navy cargo freighter Big Horn who becomes affected by the signal. (in "Trees Made of Glass, Parts 1 and 2")

Episodes
Episodes from "The Crossing" onwards saw their first broadcast on Sky1 in the UK.

 Cancellation 
According to writer Brannon Braga on the 2006 DVD release, word that production of the series was being terminated was received midway through shooting of the episode "Alienville". The ending of the episode was changed to show Molly having a dream conversation with an alien-human baby (who had been born in the episode, but appeared in the dream as a nine-year-old boy). The boy tells Molly that her Threshold plan will eventually succeed in stopping the alien invasion (the age of the boy implies it will happen within nine years), but that she would herself "not be there" (i.e. die) before this happens.

When the show was moved to Tuesday, it was shown at the same time as the popular show Law & Order: Special Victims Unit and one week had to also compete with the American Music Awards as well.  This resulted in a ratings drop, which caused the show to be canceled.

Show mythology
The infection
The main threat of the series was sent to Earth by an Alien probe that infected the crew of the USNS Big Horn. The infection can be spread in a multitude of ways from bodily fluids to sound waves. Both humans and animals are susceptible to infection and is implied through the show the aliens wish to terraform the whole world to suit their needs.  Even plants can be genetically modified to spread the alien DNA by consumption.  Dr. Fenway discovered that pre-pubescent humans and animals are immune to the infection, apparently due to their stronger immune systems:  as soon as humans are capable of reproducing, the alien infection can reproduce in them.

In the series, four variants were discovered to occur in humans who were exposed to the signal including:

Infectee Humans who were exposed to the infection and have been converted into "aliens". They appear like ordinary people but their DNA structure has been altered to include a third helix. They are stronger, faster and smarter than humans but have no humanity, emotions or compassion. To ordinary humans they would appear to have the mindset of a sociopath.
Mutation Individuals who were exposed to the infection but whose bodies reacted badly to the infection. Rather than being converted they are grotesquely and fatally deformed by the infection in what is surmised to be the immune system's failed attempt to combat the virus. Death can be instant or the individual can survive for a time but the process drives them murderously insane where they will attempt to kill themselves and others.
Dreamers Humans who have had limited or low-level exposure to the infection and as a result are only slightly altered. They become attuned to the alien consciousness and are able to listen in on the alien intelligence.
Hybrids A one in a million freak occurrence where an individual is only half transformed by the alien signal due to inherent genetic disorder.  In the case of Julian Slone his defective gene for hypertrophic cardiomyopathy was activated by his infection and stopped the conversion process halfway through. Hybrids are as strong and durable as the aliens but retain their humanity. One unique feature of a hybrid is their ability to perceive those who have been exposed to the infection by a blue-green aura that surrounds the exposed individual. Despite this, they lack the ability to distinguish between someone with minimal exposure or a full-blown infectee.

 The alien plan 
In Episode 11, which was unaired in the US, one of the hybrids reveals that the aliens plan to save humankind by changing their DNA and the surface of the earth. This is because millennia ago, far out in space, two neutron stars collided, creating a gamma ray burst - the radiation of which is heading for Earth and will, when it arrives in six years, end all life on the surface of the planet. Because the revelation came from a hybrid, this explanation is considered suspect and that the hybrid's sole intention is to slow the Threshold program. NASA sends a Top Secret letter to Caffrey confirming the alien allegation about the cosmic radiation impact on Earth in 6 years. The text of that letter is below:

 Planned storylines 
A featurette included on the August 2006 DVD release of the series confirmed a number of reported and rumored storylines that were planned had the series survived:
 The series had a three-year arc that would have seen the series change its title each year, from Threshold to Foothold, referring to the next level of Molly Caffrey's plan for a mass alien invasion, and finally to Stranglehold in which a well-established alien presence has appeared on Earth.
 In the episode "Vigilante", it is revealed that Ramsey has a drug and alcohol problem. This would have progressed causing Ramsey to "hit bottom" at one point. Meanwhile, it would be discovered that the abnormality in Ramsey's brain that caused his short stature actually made him immune to the alien infection.
 The Threshold team would learn that 80 more probe ships were headed to Earth.
 The aliens had been sending probes to Earth every 160 years or so, but these probes failed to start widespread infection due to the lack of travel and technology on the planet at the time. The episode "The Burning" hints at this with a buried 320-year-old probe. The episode "Outbreak" continued this arc by having Lucas encounter a 19th-century man in a dream who says he fought and defeated the aliens.

The episodes that were not aired by CBS also included several plot elements that would probably have been explored had the series continued: for example, Dr. Sloan, the so-called "Vigilante" introduced in the episode of the same name, whose self-appointed mission is to kill infectees (the episode also indicates a romantic attraction between him and Caffrey); the real nature of the gamma ray burst headed for Earth indicated in "The Crossing"; the effect of Threshold on Lucas Peggs' marriage; Cavennaugh's search for his brother (who becomes infected and provides the aliens with information about Threshold); the development of an alien infectee culture (who refer to themselves as "improved" humans) and their perception that the US government is persecuting them (an element introduced in the final episode, "Alienville"); and the aftermath of Caffrey's orders to increase Threshold's powers in "Outbreak".

 Broadcast history 

 International broadcasters 
 Australia: Network Ten Aired On Network Ten on December 18, 2005, moved to late Wednesday nights, later moved to Ten HD. Showed at 10.30pm Tuesdays, the channels aired all 13 episodes. Sci Fi Channel (Australia) began airing episodes on Sunday afternoons on February 21, 2010.
 Arab World: MBC Action, beginning on August 11, 2007.
 Belgium: VT4, beginning on January 3, 2010.  Only first 9 episodes aired.
 Bosnia and Herzegovina: FTV, beginning on January 3, 2009,
 Brazil: AXN, beginning on August 28, 2006, occupying a Lost time slot between seasons 2 and 3.
 Canada: Space
 Croatia: Nova TV, beginning January 3, 2008
 Chile: Red TV
 Denmark: TV 2
 Finland: Nelonen
 France: M6
 Germany: ProSieben, beginning March 3, 2008 under the title Nemesis: Der Angriff - including all 13 episodes.
 Greece: Star Channel
 Hungary: TV2
 Iceland: SkjárEinn
 Ireland: Sky1
 Israel: Channel 1
 Italy: Rai Due
 Japan: Sci Fi Channel
 Kosovo: RTV 21
 Latin America: AXN, beginning on August 28, 2006, occupying a Lost time slot between seasons 2 and 3.
 Macedonia: Sitel
 Malaysia: NTV7
 México: AXN, beginning on August 28, 2006, occupying a Lost time slot between seasons 2 and 3.
 Netherlands: Veronica, beginning January 7, 2008. Plays 2 episodes every Monday.
 New Zealand: TV3, beginning November 30, 2007.
 Norway: TV2
 Philippines: RPN 9 / C/S 9
 Poland: TV4, Polsat, AXN
 Portugal: MOV beginning 22 January 2013.
 Québec: Ztélé, French version beginning on January 1, 2007, under the title Threshold: premier contact.
 Romania: PrimaTV
 Russia: TV3
 Serbia: RTS1
 Slovakia: TV JOJ
 Spain: Telecinco
 Sweden: TV4 Plus
 Thailand: True Series
 Turkey: Digiturk(Dizimax)
 United Kingdom: Sky1 (repeated on Sky2, Sky3, & Pick), Sci Fi Channel
 United States: CBS, (repeated on Universal HD)

 Web broadcasting Threshold was the first CBS television series to utilize "streaming video" to re-air new episodes after the original airdate. Each new episode was posted on the CBS website five days after its original airdate and remained accessible there for three days. Nancy Tellem, president of the CBS Paramount Network Television Entertainment Group, stated that "the goal here is to recruit new viewers to Threshold, help existing viewers catch up if they've missed some episodes and drive more traffic to CBS.com." Survivor and The Amazing Race both utilized a similar method for post-show interviews and discussions.  The following television season (2006–07) CBS incorporated this concept into a streaming video area on their website called Innertube. Additionally, "Behind the scenes" video clips for Threshold were available on the site.

Reception
The show received generally favorable reviews from critics, and has a rating of 64/100 on metacritic.com based on 26 reviews.  The best came from USA Today, who say "Convincingly smart, realistically unsettled and sexy as all get-out, Gugino radiates so much TV star power, it just might be visible from outer space." On the other end, the Philadelphia Inquirer says "There's nothing inviting about the ponderous Threshold. Portentous music plays. Scared smart guys, rounded up by the government to figure out what's really happening, say smart-guy stupid stuff."

References

 External links 
 
 Threshold'' at EPisodeWorld.com

2005 American television series debuts
2006 American television series endings
2000s American science fiction television series
2000s American drama television series
CBS original programming
English-language television shows
Television series by CBS Studios
Heyday Films films
Works by David S. Goyer
Fictional government investigations of the paranormal
Alien invasions in television